The Ridge and the River (1952) is the debut novel by Australian writer Tom Hungerford. It won the 1952 ALS Gold Medal.

Plot summary
The novel is based on the author's experiences serving with the Australian army fighting the Japanese in Papua New Guinea during World War II. The story follows an Australian patrol of a dozen men sent to reconnoitre a Japanese position on Bougainville Island.  An action ensues in which two of the Australians are injured.  The patrol must then find a way back to base, through the jungle, evading the Japanese and ensuring their wounded reach safety.

Reviews
Ainslie Baker in The Australian Women's Weekly noted that the author "...has written a book that is utterly without pretension. The result is a vigor and authenticity that lifts the work far above the average war story. Its mateship is never mawkish, its disenchanted soldier humor never forced, nor its emotion debased to sentimentality."

In a survey of Australian war novels from the 1950s Rick Hosking wrote in 1985: "By 1954, several possible ways of using the past, of reworking subjects from the war, must have been apparent to intending ex-servicemen-novelists: the novel with the strongly-felt anti-war theme, the novel of apprenticeship, with war making Bills out of Billys, the novel describing the exploits of the 'terrible laughing men in the slouch hats', or the novel based on real, dramatic events. T. A. G. Hungerford's The Ridge and the River, published in 1952, offered one more alternative, one that, in the long run, proved the most enduring. He chose to limit the scope of his novel, taking what must have been reasonably typical experiences of jungle warfare, and concentrating on character types not normally found in war fiction, ordinary but complicated human beings. In other words, Hungerford chose not to depict the digger of legend and myth, nor did he set out to describe the great battles where wars are won or lost, nor did he rework heroic or dramatic real events. Instead he deliberately confined his attentions to several days in the life of a commando patrol on an un-named island (no doubt Bougainville) at the very end of the war, with the Hiroshima bombing only days away."

Awards and nominations 
 1952 — winner ALS Gold Medal

Notes 
The novel was serialised in condensed form, in 9 parts, in the following Australian newspapers:
 The Sunday Herald, weekly, starting from 22 June 1952
 The Argus, daily, starting from 28 July 1952
 The Western Mail, weekly, starting from 31 July 1952

References

1952 Australian novels
ALS Gold Medal winning works
Novels set during World War II
Novels set in Oceania
1952 debut novels
Angus & Robertson books